Nguyễn Anh Đức (born 24 October 1985) is a Vietnamese professional football manager and former player He is currently the manager of V.League 2 side Long An and an assistant coach for Vietnam national football team. 

He played for Becamex Binh Duong FC for the majority of his career. He is also a former member of the Vietnam national football team.

Career statistics

Club

International

Honours
Becamex Bình Dương F.C.
V.League 1: 2007, 2008, 2014, 2015
Vietnamese National Cup: 2015, 2018
Vietnamese Super Cup: 2007, 2008, 2014, 2015
AFC Cup: Semi-final: 2009
Vietnam Olympic
VFF Cup: 2018
Asian Games: Fourth place: 2018
Vietnam
AFF Championship: 2018
King's Cup: Runners-up: 2019

Individual honours
  Vietnamese Golden Ball  : 2015
  Vietnamese Silver Ball  : 2017, 2018
  Top goalscorer V.League 1  : 2017

International career

International goals

Vietnam Olympic

Vietnam
Scores and results list Vietnam's goal tally first.

References

External links

1985 births
Living people
Vietnamese footballers
Vietnam international footballers
2007 AFC Asian Cup players
Becamex Binh Duong FC players
V.League 1 players
Association football forwards
Footballers at the 2006 Asian Games
Footballers at the 2010 Asian Games
Footballers at the 2018 Asian Games
Asian Games competitors for Vietnam